Livengood  is a census-designated place (CDP) in Yukon-Koyukuk Census Area, Alaska, United States. The population was 13 at the 2010 census, down from 29 in 2000.

History
Gold was discovered in 1914, on Livengood Creek by N.R. Hudson and Jay Livengood.  The village was founded near the Hudson/Livengood claim as a mining camp during the winter of 1914-1915, when hundreds of people came into the district.

A post office was established in 1915 and was discontinued in 1957.

A construction camp was located near Livengood during the construction of the Trans-Alaska Pipeline.

Livengood was the last operating location of the antiquated 2600 MHz telephone trunk system. It was switched to the modern system in March 2011.

Geography
Livengood is located at  (65.489993, -148.546629).

Climate
Livengood has a dry-winter continental subarctic climate (Köppen Dwc).

Demographics

Livengood first appeared on the 1920 U.S. Census as an unincorporated village. It continued to appear until 1950. It did not return again until 2000, when it was made a census-designated place (CDP).

As of the census of 2000, there were 29 people, 13 households, and 6 families residing in the CDP. The population density was 0.1 people per square mile (0.0/km2). There were 31 housing units at an average density of 0.11/sq mi (0.04/km2). The racial makeup of the CDP was 83% White, 7% Native American, 3% Asian, and 7% from two or more races.

There were 13 households, out of which 15% had children under the age of 18 living with them, 40% were married couples living together, and 55% were non-families. 45% of all households were made up of individuals, and 10% had someone living alone who was 65 years of age or older. The average household size was 2.2 and the average family size was 3.2.

In the CDP, the age distribution of the population shows 31% under the age of 18, 21% from 25 to 44, 45% from 45 to 64, and 3% who were 65 years of age or older. The median age was 44 years. For every 100 females, there were 107 males [14 females, 15 males]. For every 100 females age 18 and over, there were 150 males [8 females, 12 males].

The median income for a household in the CDP was $26,250, and the median income for a family was $26,250. Males had a median income of $51,250 versus $0 for females. The per capita income for the CDP was $21,215. There were no families and 15% of the population living below the poverty line, including no under eighteens and none of those over 64.

References

Census-designated places in Alaska
Census-designated places in Unorganized Borough, Alaska
Census-designated places in Yukon–Koyukuk Census Area, Alaska